Sheena E. Conn is a former unionist politician in Northern Ireland.

Born in Belfast, Conn studied at Queen's University Belfast, then worked as a school dentist.

Sheena married Douglas Conn, President of the North Londonderry Unionist Association, and moved to Limavady, where she joined the Ulster Unionist Party (UUP).  Despite having no political experience, she stood for election in Londonderry at the 1973 Northern Ireland Assembly election, and was successful, then held her seat on the Northern Ireland Constitutional Convention in 1975.

Conn was also prominent in the Girl Guides leadership, and more recently has run a pick-your-own fruit farm.

References

Year of birth missing
Possibly living people
Alumni of Queen's University Belfast
Members of the Northern Ireland Assembly 1973–1974
Members of the Northern Ireland Constitutional Convention
Politicians from Belfast
People from Limavady
Ulster Unionist Party politicians
Women in the politics of Northern Ireland
20th-century politicians from Northern Ireland
Irish dentists